Sandra Siew Pin Lee Rebish (born December 20, 1970), also known as Dr. Pimple Popper, is an American dermatologist and YouTuber based in Upland, California. She is known for her online videos and her TV series Dr. Pimple Popper.

Early life and education 
Sandra Siew Pin Lee was born in the Flushing section of Queens, New York, on December 20, 1970, to ethnically Chinese parents; her father, a retired dermatologist, is Singaporean while her mother is Malaysian. Her parents migrated to New York in 1969, and the family relocated to Southern California when Lee was five years old.

Lee attended UCLA as an undergraduate student. During this time, she worked part-time as a medical assistant for an allergist in Downtown Los Angeles. After her graduation from UCLA, Lee attended medical school at the Drexel University College of Medicine and graduated in 1998. She completed her internship at Allegheny General Hospital in Pittsburgh. Lee completed her dermatology residency at Southern Illinois University. After her residency finished, she went to San Diego to further her experience with laser, dermatological and cosmetic surgery. Lee now lives in Upland, California with her husband, fellow dermatologist Jeffrey C. Rebish (married May 28, 2000), and currently works at Skin Physicians & Surgeons.

Career 
Lee is a board certified dermatologist and a member of the American Academy of Dermatology, the American Academy of Cosmetic Surgery, the American Society for Dermatologic Surgery, and the American Society for Mohs Surgery.

Online video

In 2010, Lee began uploading videos to YouTube but did not begin to heavily post content until 2015, after she noticed the popularity of her Instagram videos of skin extractions. In exchange for written client permission to record and post content, Lee offers patients discounted or free treatment. In late 2019 the decision to make future content subscription-based drew criticism. She explained that it was caused by YouTube having blocked advertising in the channel's videos that usually featured unsightly material and thus the channel needing another source of funding.

Skincare

In 2017, Lee launched her own line of skin care products, SLMD Skincare Products. Products in the line include acne cleanser and lotion, clarifying treatment with retinol, and daily moisturizer. Prior to this, Lee also sold comedo extractors and other merchandise branded with the name of her channel.

Television

In 2018, Lee signed with TLC to have her own Dr. Pimple Popper TV series, which premiered on July 11. A special Christmas episode of Dr. Pimple Popper, "The 12 Pops of Christmas", aired on December 13, 2018. Season 2 of Dr. Pimple Popper premiered in January 2019, and Season 3 premiered in the United States on July 11, 2019. The fourth season premiered on December 26, 2019.

Popular culture 
 The Comedy Central game show @midnight mentioned her growing Instagram popularity during an opening segment. 
 Lee has over 7.3 million people (as of December 2021) subscribed to her YouTube channel, with total viewers being one billion and counting. On August 14, 2018, she made a guest appearance on Jimmy Kimmel Live!

Awards

References

External links 
 
 SLMD Skincare official website

Living people
1970 births
21st-century American physicians
American dermatologists
American people of Chinese descent
American people of Malaysian descent
American people of Singaporean descent
American YouTubers
Drexel University alumni
People from Upland, California
Physicians from California
University of California, Los Angeles alumni
21st-century American women physicians
People from Flushing, Queens
Educational and science YouTubers
Celebrity doctors
Physicians from New York City